is a multi-directional shooter arcade game released in 1980 by Sega.

Gameplay

The player controls a yellow hunter, and must kill all the animals and bring them back to his truck. The player, after shooting an animal, has 30 seconds to bring the animal back to the truck through the six exits in the stage. Once an animal is brought into the truck, the number under the animal's head placed on the truck will be raised by one, and once all the animals have been brought back to the truck, the player moves onto the next stage. The player will receive a 10% bonus if the player doesn't waste any shots while killing the animals.

Release
The game was ported to the SG-1000 in 1983 under the name , and was developed by Compile and was later included as a bonus game in the game Dynamite Cop where it kept the original name. The original game was also included in Sega Ages 2500 Vol. 23: Sega Memorial Selection for the PlayStation 2 in 2005; and that compilation was later released for the PlayStation Network in 2012 with the "Sega Ages" label removed.

Notes

References
https://www.arcade-museum.com/game_detail.php?game_id=10183
http://www.hardcoregaming101.net/tranquilizergun/tranquilizergun.htm

PlayStation 2 games
Dreamcast games
SG-1000 games
Arcade video games
Shooter video games
Video games developed in Japan